Albert Welles Ristine (May 1, 1878 – December 13, 1935) was an American football player and coach. He served as the seventh head football coach at Iowa State University in Ames, Iowa and he held that position for five seasons, from 1902 until 1906. His career coaching record at Iowa State was 36–10–1. This ranks him third at Iowa State in total wins and first at Iowa State in winning percentage. He attended Harvard University. He died at a physician's office in Virginia in 1935.

Head coaching record

References

External links

1878 births
1935 deaths
19th-century players of American football
American football halfbacks
Harvard Crimson football players
Iowa State Cyclones football coaches
Sportspeople from Fort Dodge, Iowa
People from West Des Moines, Iowa
Players of American football from Iowa